Brendon O'Connor (born 11 September 1989) is a New Zealand rugby union player, who plays as flanker for Rugby New York (Ironworkers) in Major League Rugby (MLR). Between 2015 and 2019 he played for Leicester Tigers in England's Premiership Rugby.

O'Connor won the 2009 IRB Junior World Championship with New Zealand Under 20. In 2012, O'Connor was a member of the  Wider Training Group and made two Super Rugby appearances that season. O'Connor would go on to win over 40 Super Rugby caps for the Blues, winning the Blues MVP Award and Player's Player award in 2015.

O'Connor joined English club Leicester Tigers for the 2015-2016 Aviva Premiership season. O'Connor made his debut for Leicester Tigers on 13 November 2015 in the opening match of the European Rugby Champions Cup at Welford Road. O'Connor impressed on his debut, winning crucial turnovers, and scoring a try. On 15 May 2019 he was announced as one of the players to leave Leicester following the end of the 2018–19 Premiership Rugby season.

On 7 June 2019, O'Connor re-signed with Hawke's Bay in New Zealand.

In January 2022, Rugby New York announced that O'Connor would join the club to play in the Major League Rugby competition.

O'Connor is qualified to represent England at international level through his grandmother.

References

External links
ItsRugby.co.uk Player Statistics
NZ Rugby History profile

Living people
1989 births
New Zealand rugby union players
Crusaders (rugby union) players
Blues (Super Rugby) players
Canterbury rugby union players
Hawke's Bay rugby union players
Rugby union flankers
Rugby union players from Gisborne, New Zealand
People educated at Gisborne Boys' High School
Leicester Tigers players
New Zealand expatriate rugby union players
New Zealand expatriate sportspeople in England
Expatriate rugby union players in England
Sunwolves players
Rugby New York players